Belus Prajoux Nadjar (born 27 February 1955) is a retired professional tennis player from Chile.

Prajoux won six doubles titles on the ATP Tour during his career. He reached a highest doubles ranking of No. 17 in July 1982. He was a member of the Chile Davis Cup team, and played on the team that reached the final of the 1976 Davis Cup.  Prajoux retired from the tour in 1986.

Grand Slam finals

Doubles (1 loss)

ATP career finals

Doubles (6 wins, 12 losses)

External links
 
 
 

1955 births
Living people
Chilean male tennis players
Chilean people of French descent
Tennis players from Santiago
20th-century Chilean people